Ragnarok Online 2: Legend of The Second is a massively multiplayer online role-playing game developed and published by Gravity Co. and is the sequel to Ragnarok Online.

In July 2010 it was announced the first iteration of the game, Ragnarok Online 2: The Gate of the World,  had been scrapped, and a new version, Ragnarok Online 2: Legend of the Second, would be developed instead. The new iteration of Ragnarok Online 2 returns to the systems and mechanics of the original Ragnarok Online while keeping the 3D engine. The game engine was changed several times since its predecessor opened its long running closed beta in 2007. It was mentioned that the new version of Ragnarok Online 2 will be using the Gamebryo video game engine. The previous iteration used Unreal Engine 2.5.

Ragnarok Online 2 SEA is published by AsiaSoft for Malaysia, Singapore, Thailand and Vietnam. Ragnarok Online 2 is published by Gravity Interactive for all of North America and Europe. The game was in open beta from in April 2013, and was launched on May 1, 2013.

Gameplay

Job system
Aside from simply selecting a class, players can also choose a profession.  You choose to be a Chef, Alchemist, Artisan or Blacksmith. Each job specializes in crafting a specific type of items which will be beneficial to the players themselves or to trade with other players. To increase your level in a specific job, you would need to gain Job Experience. In order to gain Job Experience, one would need to constantly craft based on recipes of that job or mine/gather materials. To get the recipes you would need to talk to the respective Job NPC.

In addition to the job system, there is also a newly introduced Dual-Life System in which characters can take upon a secondary role. These roles offer unique abilities that help in expanding the capabilities of a specific character.

Dual-Life system
Of all the classes brought back to life from the original Ragnarok Online, only the Merchant class was not included. The new Dual-Life System allows character development in a whole new light. Instead of using a Merchant to set up shops and vend, players are enabled, with a new function, to set up their characters as NPC's (non-playable characters) while they are offline, rendering their services (healing, crafting, tailoring etc.) to active players to make a profit(such as equipment crafting).

Card system
In a recent interview with Gravity Co., Ltd. CTO Jin-soo Jun, it was revealed that the card system will indeed be making a comeback, but this time the cards will be attached to the character instead of individual items. The reason for this change is that in Ragnarok Online many rare items were often overshadowed by low-level items socketed with powerful cards. This made the inherent abilities in rare items much less relevant, and it proved to be a limiting factor when making new content.  Furthermore, many players had trouble obtaining such cards because they were incredibly rare.  To counter these issues, cards will be implemented in ranks of bronze, silver, and gold.  Therefore, a gold card will be difficult to obtain, whereas the bronze card will be relatively common. This new system has then been modified in the "Limited Edition Test" so that instead of bronze, silver, and gold cards, there will be regular and special cards. By combining up to 5 different cards at the card master, players will be rewarded with a special card which will further increase its stats. Once a player has the maximum amount of cards equipped, he or she must destroy one of the equipped cards to replace it with a new one. However, replacing a special card with a new one will result in the card being sent back to the inventory instead.

Pet system
The pet system from Ragnarok Online will also be making a comeback. In Ragnarok Online 2 players are required to collect the Monster DNA in order to make them as a pet, The Pets will assist players with attack and buff or de-buff.

Development
The game's first Closed Beta Test was set on August 31, 2010, and all past testers of Ragnarok Online 2: The Gate of the World received access to the CBT if they activated their accounts on the website.

On January 25, 2011, Gravity Corp. initiated their second Closed Beta Test that lasted 4 days. Named the "R-Care Test", its aim was to evaluate the content and changes that occurred after the initial CBT, as many popular suggestions were applied to the game.

As of February 22, 2012, Ragnarok 2 has been said to be online for OBT.

On November 4, 2012, it has been rumored that the First English service for Ragnarok Online 2 would be released in December 2012.

On January 6, 2013, Ragnarok Online 2: Legend of the Second started its Open Beta Phase on the SEA Server, published by AsiaSoft, PlayPark.

On April 18, 2013, Ragnarok Online 2: Legend of the Second will start beta for NA server published by WarpPortal.

On April 27, 2013, Ragnarok Online 2 appeared on the Steam platform citing a May 1, 2013 release date.

On August 28, 2013, Ragnarok Online 2: Legend of the Second started its Open Beta Phase on the Indonesia Server, published by Lyto.

On December 23, 2013, Gravity announced that it will be taking Ragnarok Online 2 offline in Korea because of lack of players, but the developer did include a hint of hope in the shutdown notice that the game could return in the future. The shutdown would not affect the NA, EU or SEA versions of the game.

On October 9, 2014, Asiasoft/Playpark will shut down SEA server. However, characters from SEA server may be transferred to NA server and continue their progress.

On May 25, 2018, the European servers of Ragnarok Online and Ragnarok Online 2 were shut down in most of Europe, excluding CIS countries.

References

Ragnarok Online 2 Indonesia Announced

External links
 European Ragnarok 2 site - Official European Ragnarok 2 website
 North America Ragnarok 2 site - Official North America server teaser page  Ragnarok 2 website

2012 video games
Active massively multiplayer online games
Gamebryo games
Massively multiplayer online role-playing games
 
Video game remakes
Video game sequels
Video games based on Norse mythology
Video games developed in South Korea
Video games scored by Yoko Kanno
Windows games
Windows-only games
Asiasoft games

ja:ラグナロクオンラインII
pt:Ragnarok Online 2